2004 World Ice Hockey Championships may refer to:
 2004 Men's World Ice Hockey Championships
 2004 Women's World Ice Hockey Championships
 2004 World Junior Ice Hockey Championships
 2004 IIHF World U18 Championships